Panhandling may refer to:

 Aggressive panhandling
Begging

See also
 BEG (disambiguation)
 Mendicant, mendicant orders may authorize "begging" in some societies
 Salient (geography) or panhandle